Nazira is a feminine given name and a surname. People with the name include:

Given name
 Nazira Abdula (born 1969), Mozambique pediatrician and politician
 Nazira Aytbekova, Kyrgyz television presenter
 Nazira Zain al-Din (1908–1976), Lebanese scholar
 Nazira Jumblatt, (1890–1951), Lebanese political figure
 Nazira Karodia, South African chemist
 Nazira Farah Sarkis (born 1962), Syrian politician

Surname
 Ashley Nazira (born 1995), Mauritian football player

Fictional characters
 Nazira Hashim, one of the characters in the 2010 Colombian telenovela El clon

See also
 Nazira (disambiguation)

Feminine given names
Surnames from given names